The Italian men's national ice hockey team is the national ice hockey team of Italy, and is controlled by the Federazione Italiana Sport del Ghiaccio (FISG), a member of the International Ice Hockey Federation.

Tournament record

Olympic Games

World Championship

Thayer Tutt Trophy
1980 – Finished in 5th place
1988 – Finished in 1st place

European Championship
1924 – Finished in 5th place
1926 – Finished in 8th place
1929 – Finished in 4th place

Roster
Roster for the 2022 IIHF World Championship.

Head coach: Greg Ireland

Uniform evolution

References

External links

IIHF profile
National Teams of Ice Hockey

Ice hockey teams in Italy
National ice hockey teams in Europe